Teodoro A. Dehesa Méndez  (October 1, 1848 – September 25, 1936) was the Governor of the state of Veracruz in Mexico for five terms from 1892 to 1911.

Early years 
Teodoro Dehesa was the son of Teodoro Dehesa y Bayona, an Aragonese pastry chef, and Antonia Méndez y Ruiz de Olivares, member of a wealthy family of Xalapa, Veracruz.

He studied his first letters at La Amiga, under supervision of Jacinta, Dolores and Carmen Torres. Later he studied at the Juan Rodríguez College. After his family moved to Xalapa, he finished his primary education at Francisco Ramos school and then joined Teodoro Kerlegand's Liceum.

Assisting of Diego Rivera
When the artist Diego Rivera was looking for a sponsor to allow him to travel to Europe to further his art career, he approached Dehesa, who agreed to sponsor him. A chapter in Diego Rivera's autobiography, My Art, My Life, was dedicated to Dehesa and details how the opposition forces respected Dehesa and so refused to attack the city in which he was staying. Diego Rivera also mentioned his great respect for Dehesa.

Mexican Revolution
As a result of the Mexican Revolution of 1910, Teodoro Dehesa, his son, and Teodoro's brother, Francisco, were forced to flee Mexico. Teodoro Dehesa moved to Cuba and, at some point, returned to Mexico, where he later died in 1936.

Legacy
Descendants of Teodoro Dehesa still live in Mexico. It is unknown what happened to Francisco Dehesa, but his wife and children moved to California, where their descendants still live.

References 
 Rivera, Diego. My Life, My Art. Dover Publications, Inc., New York, 1991.

1848 births
1936 deaths
Governors of Veracruz